LPCC can refer to:

Computing 

 Low-priority congestion control, such as Low Extra Delay Background Transport (LEDBAT).

Medicine 

 Lafayette Parish Correctional Center
 Licensed Professional Clinical Counselor